Accident Investigation Board was civil transportation accident investigation board of Turkey. The board established on May 6, 2013, and abolished on May 11, 2019. It was replaced by the Transport Safety Investigation Center. It was affiliated to the Ministry of Transport and Infrastructure.

References

External links 
 

Government agencies of Turkey
Organizations investigating aviation accidents and incidents
Rail accident investigators
Transport organizations based in Turkey

Ministry of Transport and Infrastructure (Turkey)
Transport safety organizations